Xinguara Airport  is an airport serving Xinguara, Brazil.

Airlines and destinations
No scheduled flights operate at this airport.

Access
The airport is located  westward from downtown Xinguara.

See also

List of airports in Brazil

References

External links
 
 
 

Airports in Pará